Cnemaspis caudanivea,  also known as the Hon Tre Island rock gecko, is a species of gecko endemic to southern Vietnam around Hon Tre Island, Kiên Giang Province and lives at a 100-meter elevation.

Etymology 
In Latin, cauda is translated into "tail", while niveus is an adjective meaning "of snow or snow like". Therefore, C. caudanivea'''s specific epithet describes its snow-colored tail.

 Description C. caudanivea'''s tail is brilliant white in colour.

References

Cnemaspis
Lizards of Asia
Reptiles described in 2007